Carrières-sur-Seine is a commune in the Yvelines department in the Île-de-France region in north-central France.

The inhabitants of the town of Carrières-sur-Seine are called Carrillons (masculine plural) or Carrillonnes (feminine plural) in French, not to confuse with "carillon(ne)s" which would translate into "Chimes" and "Ringing," respectively.

Population

Education
Preschool and elementary schools (each group has one preschool and one elementary school):
 Groupe Maurice Berteaux
 Groupe Alouettes / Prévert (Maternelle des Alouettes and Elémentaire J. Prévert)
 Groupe Victor Hugo / Parc (Maternelle Victor Hugo and Elémentaire du Parc)
 Groupe Plants de Catelaine

Secondary schools in Carrières-sur-Seine:
 Collège Les Amandiers
 Lycée Les Pierres Vives

Secondary schools in nearby municipalities:
 Collège Lamartine (Houilles)
 Lycée Evariste Galois (Sartrouville)
 Lycée Jules Verne (Sartrouville)
 The British School of Paris (Croissy Sur Seine)

See also
Communes of the Yvelines department

References

External links

 Carrières-sur-Seine  

Communes of Yvelines